Cyril Parry (14 October 1900 – 6 July 1984) was an Australian cricketer. He played first-class cricket for South Australia and Tasmania from 1925 to 1934.

See also
 List of South Australian representative cricketers
 List of Tasmanian representative cricketers

References

External links
 

1900 births
1984 deaths
Australian cricketers
South Australia cricketers
Tasmania cricketers
Cricketers from Adelaide
People from Queenstown, South Australia